The sources of Hamlet, Prince of Denmark, a tragedy by William Shakespeare believed to have been written between 1599 and 1601, trace back as far as pre-13th century. The generic "hero-as-fool" story is so old and is expressed in the literature of so many cultures that scholars have hypothesized that it may be Indo-European in origin. A Scandinavian version of the story of Hamlet (called Amleth or Amlóði, which means "mad" or "not sane" in Old Norse) was put into writing around 1200 AD by Danish historian Saxo Grammaticus in his work Gesta Danorum (the first full history of Denmark). It is this work Shakespeare borrowed from to create Hamlet. Similar accounts are found in the Icelandic Saga of Hrolf Kraki and the Roman legend of Lucius Junius Brutus, both of which feature heroes who pretend to be insane in order to get revenge. A reasonably accurate version of Saxo's story was translated into French in 1570 by François de Belleforest in his Histoires Tragiques. Belleforest embellished Saxo's text substantially, almost doubling its length, and introduced the hero's melancholy.

After this point, the ancestry of Shakespeare's version of Hamlet becomes more difficult to trace. Many literary scholars believe that Shakespeare's main source was an earlier play—now lost—known today as the Ur-Hamlet. Possibly written by Thomas Kyd, the Ur-Hamlet would have been in performance by 1589 and was seemingly the first to include a ghost in the story. Using the few comments available from theatre-enthusiasts at the time, scholars have attempted to trace exactly where the Ur-Hamlet might have ended and the play popular today begins. A few scholars have suggested that the Ur-Hamlet is an early draft of Shakespeare's, rather than the work of Kyd. Regardless of the mysteries surrounding the Ur-Hamlet, though, several elements of the story changed. Unlike earlier versions, Shakespeare's Hamlet does not feature an omniscient narrator of events and Prince Hamlet does not appear to have a complete plan of action. The play's setting in Elsinore also differs from legendary versions.

Scandinavian legend

The story of the prince who plots revenge on his uncle (the current king) for killing his father (the former king) is an old one. Many of the story elements—the prince feigning madness and his testing by a young woman, the prince talking to his mother and her hasty marriage to the usurper, the prince killing a hidden spy and substituting the execution of two retainers for his own—are found in a medieval tale by Saxo Grammaticus called Vita Amlethi (part of his larger Latin work Gesta Danorum), which was written around 1200 AD. Older written and oral traditions from various cultures may have influenced Saxo's work. Amleth (as Hamlet is called in Saxo's version) probably derived from an oral tale told throughout Scandinavia. Parallels can be found with Icelandic legend, though no written version of the original Icelandic tale survives from before the 16th century. Torfaeus, a scholar in 17th-century Iceland, made the connection between Saxo's Amleth and local oral tradition about a Prince Ambales (Amlóði).
Torfaeus dismissed the local tradition as "an old wive's tale" due to its incorporation of fairy-tale elements and quasi-historical legend and Torfaeus' own confusion about the hero's country of origin (not recognizing Cimbria as a name for Denmark).

Similarities include the prince's feigned madness, his accidental killing of the king's counsellor in his mother's bedroom, and the eventual slaying of his uncle.

The original Amlóði story has been surmised to be derived from a "10th-century" Old Icelandic poem, but no such poem is known.

The "hero as fool" story has many parallels (Roman, Spanish, Scandinavian and Arabic) and can be classified as a universal, or at least common Indo-European, narrative topos.

Influences on Saxo Grammaticus
The two most popular candidates for written works that may have influenced Saxo, however, are the anonymous Scandinavian Saga of Hrolf Kraki and the Roman legend of Brutus, which is recorded in two separate Latin works. In Saga of Hrolf Kraki, the murdered king has two sons—Hroar and Helgi—who assume the names of Ham and Hráni for concealment. They spend most of the story in disguise, rather than feigning madness, though Ham does act childishly at one point to deflect suspicion. The sequence of events differs from Shakespeare's as well.

In contrast, the Roman story of Brutus focuses on feigned madness. Its hero, Lucius ('shining, light'), changes his name and persona to Brutus ('dull, stupid'), playing the role to avoid the fate of his father and brothers, and eventually slaying his family's killer, King Tarquinius. In addition to writing in the Latin language of the Romans, Saxo adjusted the story to reflect classical Roman concepts of virtue and heroism. A reasonably accurate version of Saxo's story was translated into French in 1570 by François de Belleforest in his Histoires Tragiques. Belleforest embellished Saxo's text substantially, almost doubling its length, and introduced the hero's melancholy.

The Ur-Hamlet

Shakespeare's main source is believed to be an earlier play—now lost—known today as the Ur-Hamlet. Possibly written by Thomas Kyd, the Ur-Hamlet would have been in performance by 1589, and was seemingly the first to include a ghost in the story. Shakespeare's company, the Chamberlain's Men, may have purchased that play and performed a version, which Shakespeare reworked, for some time. Since no copy of the Ur-Hamlet has survived, it is impossible to compare its language and style with the known works of any candidate for its authorship. Consequently, there is no direct evidence that Kyd wrote it, nor any evidence that the play was not an early version of Hamlet by Shakespeare himself. This latter idea—placing Hamlet far earlier than the generally accepted date, with a much longer period of development—has attracted some support, though others dismiss it as speculation. Francis Meres's Palladis Tamia (published in 1598, probably October) provides a list of twelve named Shakespeare plays, but Hamlet is not among them. This is not conclusive, however, as other then-extant Shakespeare plays were not on Meres' list either.

The upshot is that scholars cannot assert with any confidence how much material Shakespeare took from the Ur-Hamlet (if it even existed), how much from Belleforest or Saxo, and how much from other contemporary sources (such as Kyd's The Spanish Tragedy). No clear evidence exists that Shakespeare made any direct references to Saxo's version (although its Latin text was widely available at the time). However, elements of Belleforest's version do appear in Shakespeare's play but are not in Saxo's story, so whether Shakespeare took these from Belleforest directly or through the Ur-Hamlet remains unclear.

It is clear, though, that several elements did change somewhere between Belleforest's and Shakespeare's versions. For one, unlike Saxo and Belleforest, Shakespeare's play has no all-knowing narrator, thus inviting the audience to draw their own conclusions about the motives of its characters. And the traditional story takes place across several years, while Shakespeare's covers a few weeks. Belleforest's version details Hamlet's plan for revenge, while in Shakespeare's play Hamlet has no apparent plan. Shakespeare also adds some elements that locate the action in 15th-century Christian Denmark instead of a medieval pagan setting. Elsinore, for example, would have been familiar to Elizabethan England, as a new castle had been built recently there, and Wittenberg, Hamlet's university, was widely known for its Protestant teachings. Other elements of Shakespeare's Hamlet absent in medieval versions include the secrecy that surrounds the old king's murder, the inclusion of Laertes and Fortinbras (who offer parallels to Hamlet), the testing of the king via a play, and Hamlet's death at the moment he gains his revenge.

Elizabethan court
For more than a century, Shakespearean scholars have identified several of the play's major characters with specific members of the Elizabethan court. In 1869, George Russell French theorized that Hamlets Polonius might have been inspired by William Cecil (Lord Burghley)—Lord High Treasurer and chief counsellor to Queen Elizabeth I. French also speculated that the characters of Polonius's children, Ophelia and Laertes, represented two of Burghley's children, Anne and Robert Cecil. In 1930, E. K. Chambers suggested that Polonius's advice to Laertes may have echoed Burghley's to his son Robert, and in 1932, John Dover Wilson commented "the figure of Polonius is almost without doubt intended as a caricature of Burleigh, who died on 4 August 1598". In 1963, A. L. Rowse said that Polonius's tedious verbosity might have resembled Burghley's, and in 1964, Joel Hurstfield wrote that "[t]he governing classes were both paternalistic and patronizing; and nowhere is this attitude better displayed than in the advice which that archetype of elder statesmen William Cecil, Lord Burghley—Shakespeare's Polonius—prepared for his son".

Lilian Winstanley thought the name Corambis (Polonius's name in the 1st Quarto) suggested Burghley, though Krystyna Kujawinska Courtney has pointed out that the name "Corambis" translates to "reheated cabbage" in Latin, i.e. "a boring old man".

In 1921, Winstanley claimed "absolute" certainty that "the historical analogues exist; that they are important, numerous, detailed and undeniable" and that "Shakespeare is using a large element of contemporary history in Hamlet." She compared Hamlet with both the Earl of Essex and James I. She also identified Polonius with Burghley parallels, and noted a "curious parallel" in the relationship between Ophelia and Hamlet with that of Burghley's daughter, Anne Cecil, and her husband, Edward de Vere, 17th Earl of Oxford. Winstanley noted similar parallels in the relationship of Elizabeth Vernon and Henry Wriothesley, 3rd Earl of Southampton.

Harold Jenkins criticised the idea of any direct personal satire as "unlikely" and "uncharacteristic of Shakespeare", while G. R. Hibbard hypothesized that differences in names (Corambis/Polonius; Montano/Raynoldo) between the first quarto and subsequent editions might reflect a desire not to offend scholars at Oxford University, since Polonius was close to the Latin name for Robert Pullen, founder of Oxford University, and Reynaldo too close for safety to John Rainolds, the President of Corpus Christi College.

Shakespeare's son
Most scholars, including Harold Bloom, dismiss the idea that Hamlet is in any way connected with Shakespeare's only son, Hamnet Shakespeare, who died at age eleven. Conventional wisdom holds that Hamlet is too obviously connected to legend, and the name Hamnet was quite popular at the time. However, Stephen Greenblatt has argued that the coincidence of the names and Shakespeare's grief for the loss of his son may lie at the heart of the tragedy. He notes that the name of Hamnet Sadler, the Stratford neighbor after whom Hamnet was named, was often written as Hamlet Sadler and that, in the loose orthography of the time, the names were virtually interchangeable.

Giordano Bruno
In 1989, in her book The Renaissance Drama of Knowledge, Hilary Gatti draws attention to the many startling similarities between Giordano Bruno's Lo spaccio della besta trionfante (The Expulsion of the Triumphant Beast) (1584) and Hamlet. In particular, she notes that the book Hamlet is reading in Act 2, which he paraphrases ("for the satirical rogue says here that old men have grey beards, that their faces are wrinkled, their eyes purging thick amber and plum tree gum, and they have a plentiful lack of wit, together with most weak hams" (2.2.196-200)) echoes a specific passage in the First Dialogue of The Expulsion of the Triumphant Beast, where Jupiter is describing his aging body. In addition, Gatti finds many parallels between the jesterish Momus figure in The Expulsion of the Triumphant Beast and the brilliant and witty Hamlet; both Momus and Hamlet are counterpoints to aging figures of power set in their ways: Jupiter and Claudius. And both Momus and Hamlet undertake radical reforms.
In her paper published in 2023, Marianne Kimura noted many significant details (crocodiles, fish, whales, Ossa, Pelion, Olympus and the myth of the Aloades) are found in both texts.  Such specific details would be too many to be due to mere chance. Kimura also notes that both the author of the book Hamlet is reading and Yorick (in the graveyard scene) are referred to as "rogue". Thus it is likely that the dead skull Hamlet is holding represents Giordano Bruno, burned alive for heresy the year before the play was written. While the skull is no doubt a reference to a "memento mori", the philosophy that Hamlet expounds in the graveyard ("to what base uses we may return"; "Alexander died, Alexander was buried, Alexander returneth to dust....the dust is earth, of the earth we make loam") resembles more closely the Brunian notion of "vicissitudes", the idea of constant change, involving everything, over time.

Benno Tschischwitz, a nineteenth-century translator of Shakespeare's works into German, was the first to note the similarities between Bruno's philosophy and phraseology with the play Hamlet, in his "Shakespeares Hamlet, nach historischen Gesichtspunkten erläutert" of 1868. The editor the New Variorum edition of Hamlet, H. H. Furness, considered the similarities to be slight, and not meaningful given Shakespeare's eclectic mind. John Mackinnon Robertson, writing in 1897, suggested that the similarities in wording between Bruno's comedy Il Candelajo and Hamlet were completely commonplace for the time, and were actually with the "Ur-Hamlet", "drafted by a much lesser man than Shakespere.".

Notes and references

Notes

References

Sources

Editions of Hamlet

Secondary sources

 
 
 Maric, Jasminka, "Filozofija u Hamletu", Alfa BK Univerzitet, Beograd, 2015.
 Maric, Jasminka, "Philosophy in Hamlet", author's edition, Belgrade, 2018.
 
 
 
 
 
 
 
 
 
 
 
 
 
 
 
 
 
 
 

Hamlet